The city of New York includes a sizeable Dominican population. Dominicans are one of the largest Latino groups in New York City followed by Puerto Ricans. Dominicans are the largest immigrant group in New York City. Dominicans are concentrated in Washington Heights and the Bronx in the city proper; by 2019, the share living in the city fell from 92% to 62%. The rest lived in outlying counties in the metro area.

History
The first mass immigration from the Dominican Republic to New York City began in the 1960s.

“Dominican migrants arriving in the New York metropolitan region settled primarily in New York City, in Washington Heights and the Bronx. In 1970 92% of all Dominicans living in the region were found in the City although this percentage steadily decreased in each decade until 2019 when 62% lived there, the other 38% in the surrounding counties. 

Within the City, the epicenter of Dominican settlement shifted from Washington Heights to the Bronx. By 2019 47% of all Dominicans in the City lived in the Bronx compared with 24% who lived in Manhattan.”

Notable New Yorkers of Dominican descent
Cardi B
Romeo Santos
Alex Rodriguez
Melanie Martinez
Fabolous
Ice Spice

See also

Dominican Day Parade
Puerto Ricans in New York City

References

Further reading
 Dominicans in New York City: Power From the Margins